Dolores de María Manuell Gómez Angulo (born 14 June 1948) is a Mexican politician affiliated with the National Action Party. She served as federal deputy of the LX Legislature of the Mexican Congress representing Baja California, and previously served as a local deputy in the XIII Legislature of the Congress of Baja California.

References

1948 births
Living people
People from Mexicali
Women members of the Chamber of Deputies (Mexico)
Members of the Congress of Baja California
National Action Party (Mexico) politicians
20th-century Mexican politicians
20th-century Mexican women politicians
21st-century Mexican politicians
21st-century Mexican women politicians
Deputies of the LX Legislature of Mexico
Members of the Chamber of Deputies (Mexico) for Baja California